Barsine takamukui is a moth of the family Erebidae. It was described by Shōnen Matsumura in 1927. It is found in Taiwan.

References

Moths described in 1927
Moths of Taiwan